Philippe Cola (born 14 January 1956) is a French sports shooter. He competed at the 1984 Summer Olympics, the 1988 Summer Olympics and the 1992 Summer Olympics.

References

External links
 

1956 births
Living people
French male sport shooters
Olympic shooters of France
Shooters at the 1984 Summer Olympics
Shooters at the 1988 Summer Olympics
Shooters at the 1992 Summer Olympics
Sportspeople from Meurthe-et-Moselle
20th-century French people